Sar Tang-e Mesen (also known as Sar Tan and Sar Tang) is a village in Armand Rural District, in the Central District of Lordegan County, Chaharmahal and Bakhtiari Province, Iran. At the 2006 census, its population was 703, in 141 families.

References 

Populated places in Lordegan County